Carine Russo (née Collet; born 1 May 1962) is a Belgian politician, member of Ecolo, and author. She was elected as a member of the Belgian Senate in 2007.

Her daughter, Mélissa, was one of six girls and women abducted by Marc Dutroux between 1995 and 1996. On 17 August 1996, Dutroux led police to the location where the bodies of the girls, along with that of his accomplice Bernard Weinstein, whom he admitted killing, were buried in the backyard of another of his homes in Sars-la-Buissière. On 17 August 2016, exactly twenty years after the exhumation of Mélissa and Lejeune's bodies, Carine Russo published a book, Quatorze mois, in which she included letters she had written to her daughter during the fourteen months she was missing.

See also
 Marc Dutroux
 White March
 Jean-Denis Lejeune

References

Living people
Ecolo politicians
Members of the Belgian Federal Parliament
1962 births
Politicians from Liège